Madeleine Robinson (born Madeleine Svoboda; 5 November 1917 – 1 August 2004) was a French actress. She was born to a French mother and Czech father near Paris. She was orphaned at the age of 14, and worked to support herself and her two younger brothers, but enjoyed watching plays. She then studied under Charles Dullin. Her first lead role was in Forty Little Mothers (1936). During the Occupation of France, she had a prominent role in Love Story and Summer Light (both 1943), and The Bellman (1945). Because she had acted during the Occupation, Robinson found it difficult to get work afterwards, but again came to prominence in Une si jolie petite plage (1949). Madeleine Robinson won the Volpi Cup for Best Actress in 1959 for her role in À double tour.

Selected filmography
 Madame Angot's Daughter (1935)
 Forty Little Mothers (1936)
 The Assault (1936)
 Storm Over Asia (1938)
 Le capitaine Benoît (1938)
 The Marvelous Night (1940)
 Summer Light (1943)
 Love Story (1943)
 The Bellman (1945)
 The Royalists (1947)
 The Bouquinquant Brothers (1947)
 The Fugitive (1947)
 The Story of Dr. Louise (1949)
 Between Eleven and Midnight (1949)
 The Barton Mystery (1949)
 Tuesday's Guest (1950)
 God Needs Men (1950)
 The Man in My Life (1952)
 Alone in the World (1952)
 Their Last Night (1953)
 On Trial (1954)
 Mannequins of Paris (1956)
 À double tour (Web of Passion) (1959)
 Day by Day, Desperately (1961)
 The Trial (1962) - Mrs. Grubach
 The Gentleman from Epsom (1962)
 Seven Days in January (1979)
 The Teddy Bear (1994)

References

External links

1917 births
2004 deaths
20th-century French actresses
Actresses from Paris
French film actresses
French television actresses
French people of Czech descent
Volpi Cup for Best Actress winners